Glyphodes quadrimaculalis is a moth in the family Crambidae. It was described by Otto Vasilievich Bremer and William Grey in 1853. It is found in China.

References

Moths described in 1853
Glyphodes